is a former Japanese football player and manager.

Playing career
Kimura was born in Kyoto Prefecture on July 27, 1944. After graduating from Osaka University of Economics, he joined Yanmar Diesel in 1968. He retired in 1973.

Coaching career
After retirement, Kimura became a manager for his local club Kyoto Shiko (later Kyoto Purple Sanga) in 1982. In 1991, he became an assistant coach under Shu Kamo at Yokohama Flügels. End of 1994 season, Kamo signed Japan national team manager, Kimura was promoted to manager. During 1995 season, he resigned and remained the club as a staff. End of 1998 season the club was disbanded due to financial strain. He moved to Kyoto Purple Sanga. He also managed as caretaker manager in 1999 and 2003. In June 2004, he left the club. In 2007, he became a manager for FC Suzuka Rampole. In August 2010, he was dismissed.

Managerial statistics

References

External links

1944 births
Living people
Osaka University of Economics alumni
Association football people from Kyoto Prefecture
Japanese footballers
Japan Soccer League players
Cerezo Osaka players
Japanese football managers
J1 League managers
Yokohama Flügels managers
Kyoto Sanga FC managers
Suzuka Point Getters managers
Association footballers not categorized by position